Michael Christian Berry (born November 10, 1970) is an American conservative radio talk show host based in Houston, Texas.  A former member of the Houston City Council, Berry has worked as an attorney, a real estate developer, and a restaurateur.

Early life
Berry was born and raised in Orange, Texas. His father was a chemical plant maintenance supervisor at DuPont, and his mother was a nursing home attendant.

A student body president at the University of Houston, Berry graduated magna cum laude from Houston with a B.A. in Political Science, J.D. from the University of Texas School of Law and a M.L. in international commercial law from the University of Nottingham.

Legal and real estate career
Berry began his career as a partner at the law firm Jenkens & Gilchrist. In 1997, Berry became president of residential real estate company Michael Berry Properties, later Brenham Partners.

Political career
Berry was a three-term Houston at-large city council member and also served as Mayor Pro Tem. He was named "Councilman of the Year" by the Houston Police Officers Union. After helping Houston film director and choreographer Shawn Welling with a legal dispute involving the city council, Berry became producer on the next Welling Films production, which won acclaim from notable Houston newspapers the Houston Chronicle and the Houston Press. Berry told the station, "I think that this story is so compelling that if it can generate an initial buzz, then it will take on a life of its own... The beauty of the story is it's a story of redemption."

Radio career
In 2005, Berry began hosting weekend program Michael Berry's Real Estate Review on Houston radio station NewsRadio 740 KTRH. The following year, Berry began hosting a weekday 9 a.m. to 11 a.m. talk show on sister station Talk Radio 950 KPRC that replaced the syndicated Glenn Beck Program.

On April 27, 2007, Berry became operations director for the three Clear Channel Communications AM radio stations in Houston: KTRH, KPRC, and KBME "790 the Sports Animal". Berry remained in that position until 2011. In June 2007, Berry began hosting a 5 p.m. to 8 p.m. show on KTRH in addition to his morning KPRC show. KTRH moved Berry's show to 7 p.m. to 9 p.m. in July 2007 to make room for The Sean Hannity Show and The Chris Baker Show. KPRC dropped Berry's show on July 30, 2007 as part of its revamped "Radio Mojo" format that put Walton and Johnson and Mancow's Morning Madhouse in weekday mornings. Berry returned to his old timeslot after KTRH canceled Baker's show in November 2007. In 2010, KPRC "The 9-5-0 Radio Mojo" brought back Berry in the 2 p.m. to 5 p.m. slot, and KTRH cut Berry's 5 p.m. show back one hour in order to present all three hours of The Mark Levin Show afterwards.

From 2008 to 2010, Berry hosted a weekend show Texas Time that showcased new featured music releases and festivals in Texas.

Clear Channel station in Portland, Oregon, NewsRadio 1190 KEX, began simulcasting Berry's KPRC show live in the 12 to 3 p.m. (PT) slot in April 2011.

In January 2012, KPRC replaced Berry's afternoon show with a show by KTRH morning host Matt Patrick. KTRH put Berry on the 8 a.m. to 11 a.m. slot previously occupied by the last hour of Houston's Morning News and The Glenn Beck Program; KPRC took in Glenn Beck. This marked the end of KEX broadcasting Berry live, as KEX's noon broadcast of Michael Berry became a delayed version of Berry's KTRH morning show. Berry's afternoon show has since expanded to other markets on iHeartMedia (formerly Clear Channel) stations, primarily in the Southeast.

Berry won the readers' choice award of best talk radio host from the Houston Press in 2010.

Berry has been a guest host of the nationally syndicated Mark Levin Show.

In 2021, Berry hosted The Clay Travis And Buck Sexton Show during the Christmas week.

Controversy
Referring to the Park51 Muslim community center proposed for construction near the Ground Zero site of the September 11, 2001, attacks in New York City, Berry stated on his May 26, 2010, KPRC program that if the center were to be completed, "I hope that someone blows it up". The following day, he addressed his audience, issuing a statement which said in part, "I apologize to you, my listeners, for insulting your intelligence and saying something so stupid. I do not apologize, however, for my opinion that that mosque should not be built."

In 2012, Berry was accused of using slur on Twitter during First Lady Michelle Obama's speech at that year's 2012 Democratic National Convention when he tweeted that black people are shooting each other during the speech along with the hashtag "#knuckadeads," in which some people allege is a substitute for "nigga." In January 2012, KPRC broke the news that Michael Berry was a suspect in a hit-and-run accident outside gay club T.C.'s Show Bar, the television station is now airing footage of Berry inside the bar on Jan. 31, the night in question, just before the accident occurred."

As Berry was set to receive the "Talk Personality of the Year" award during the 2017 iHeartRadio Music Awards, the Chicago Tribune reported on March 2, 2017 that Berry had a regular feature titled "Chicago Weekend Crime Report" that included snide remarks about Chicago homicide victims, including speculation of which body parts were shot and mockery of victims' names. Nearly two weeks after that article, Berry apologized, stating: "I have to make better decisions with the words I use."

In a 2015 opinion article, the Houston Press ranked Berry the "most embarrassing" Houstonian for his Park51 remarks, among other comments deemed to be racist.

Personal life
Berry has been married to Nandita Venkateswaran "Nandy" Berry since 1993. They first met as students at the University of Houston when the alumni association assigned Michael to train Nandita. They have two sons adopted from Ethiopia. From 2014-2015, Nandita Berry was the 109th Secretary of State of Texas.

The Houston Chronicle reported on February 16, 2012 that Berry had been accused of leaving the scene of an accident in the Montrose section of Houston at approximately 11 p.m. on January 31, 2012. On his February 21 radio show, Berry named KPRC-TV in criticizing news coverage of this incident as inaccurate. On February 23, 2012, the accuser settled the matter in exchange for a payment of $2,000.00 from Berry for damages to his car, without an acknowledgement of guilt by Berry. After prosecutors were unable to contact the alleged victim, they declined to pursue charges in the case.

References

External links

1970 births
Living people
American political commentators
American broadcast news analysts
American lawyers
American conservative talk radio hosts
University of Houston alumni
Houston City Council members
Alumni of the University of Nottingham
University of Texas School of Law alumni
Texas Republicans
People from Orange, Texas